Brighton Road may refer to:

A23 road, England
Brighton Road, Adelaide
Brighton Road railway station, England